Liu Lianman (December 1933 – 27 April 2016) was a Chinese mountain climber known as the "human ladder of Mount Everest".

Biography
Liu was born in Ninghe County, Hebei (now part of Tianjin) in 1933. He was selected to the Chinese Mountaineering Team in 1955. While training in the Soviet Union, he reached the summit of Mount Elbrus and Muztagh Ata (making the first ascent in the world) in 1956. He became one of the first Chinese to reach the summit of Mount Gongga in June 1957.

In May 1960, Liu and his teammates Wang Fuzhou, Qu Yinhua and Gongbu tried to ascend to the summit of Mount Everest via the north ridge. Liu volunteered to be a human ladder when the team reached the Second Step, which helped his teammates become the first to reach Everest's peak via the north face. Although failing to reach the summit, he was soon thereafter described as the "human ladder of Mount Everest" and was awarded a National Sports Medal of Honor. His heroic story Climb to the Top of the Earth was included in the Chinese textbook of junior high school. He retired from mountain climbing in 1973 and worked at Harbin Electrical Machine Factory.

Liu died on 27 April 2016 at the age of 82 in Harbin.

Achievements
1956 — Mount Elbrus (first ascent of Chinese)
1956 — Muztagh Ata  (first ascent in the world)
1957 — Mount Gongga (first ascent of Chinese)
1960 — Mount Everest (turned back at the Second Step)

See also
1960 Chinese Mount Everest expedition

References

1933 births
2016 deaths
Chinese mountain climbers
Sportspeople from Tianjin